Clinidium darlingtoni is a species of ground beetle in the subfamily Rhysodinae. It was described by R.T. Bell in 1970. It is endemic to Jamaica.

Clinidium darlingtoni measure  in length.

References

Clinidium
Beetles of North America
Insects of Jamaica
Endemic fauna of Jamaica
Beetles described in 1970